The Bush River is a  tributary of the Appomattox River in the U.S. state of Virginia. It rises northeast of Keysville near the junction of the boundaries between Charlotte, Prince Edward, and Lunenburg counties.

See also
List of rivers of Virginia

References

USGS Hydrologic Unit Map - State of Virginia (1974)

Rivers of Virginia
Tributaries of the James River
Rivers of Charlotte County, Virginia
Rivers of Prince Edward County, Virginia
Rivers of Lunenburg County, Virginia